The 2001–02 Liga Artzit season saw Hapoel Jerusalem win the title and promotion to Liga Leumit alongside runners-up Hapoel Nazareth Illit. Hapoel Tayibe (following a points deduction) and Maccabi Yavne were relegated to Liga Alef.

Final table

References
Israel Third Level 2001/02 RSSSF

Liga Artzit seasons
3
Israel